This article contains a list of insect-borne diseases. They can take the form of parasitic worms, bacteria, protozoa, viruses, or the insects directly acting as a parasite.

Insect-borne diseases

Mosquitoes
Mosquitoes are vectors for a large number of diseases, the large majority being viral in nature. Mosquito-borne viruses fall into four major groups: Bunyavirales, Flaviviridae, Togaviridae, and Reoviridae. They can present as either arbovirus encephalitis or viral hemorrhagic fevers.

Other insects

Direct parasites

Insect-borne diseases

See also 
 Arbovirus
 List of diseases spread by invertebrates
 Mosquito-borne disease
 Robovirus
 Tibovirus
 Tick-borne disease

References